Arch of Viceroy, also known as Viceroy's Arch, was erected in 1599 in Goa, India, by Viceroy , the grandson of Vasco da Gama. The arch was restored in 1954 after it faced a collapse. It is an ASI protected Monument of National Importance in Goa.

The side of the arch that faces the river, has a deer emblem on Vasco da Gama's coat of arms. The arch has a statue of Vasco da Gama at the centre. The side that faces the city has a sculpture of a European woman wearing a crown and a robe, holding a sword in one hand and an open book in the other.

References 

Old Goa
Colonial Goa
Monuments and memorials in Goa
Buildings and structures completed in 1599
Arches and vaults in India